Joan Didion (December 5, 1934 – December 23, 2021) was an American writer. She is considered one of the pioneers of New Journalism along with Gay Talese, Hunter S. Thompson, and Tom Wolfe.  Didion's career began in the 1950s after she won an essay contest sponsored by Vogue magazine. Her writing during the 1960s through the late 1970s engaged audiences in the realities of the counterculture of the 1960s, the Hollywood lifestyle, California culture, and California history. Didion's political writing in the 1980s and 1990s often concentrated on the subtext of political and social rhetoric. In 1991, she wrote the earliest mainstream media article to suggest the Central Park Five had been wrongfully convicted. In 2005, Didion won the National Book Award for Nonfiction and was a finalist for both the National Book Critics Circle Award and the Pulitzer Prize for The Year of Magical Thinking, a memoir of the year following the death of her husband, writer John Gregory Dunne. She later adapted the book into a play that premiered on Broadway in 2007. In 2013, she was awarded the National Humanities Medal by President Barack Obama. Didion was profiled in the Netflix documentary entitled, The Center Will Not Hold, directed by her nephew Griffin Dunne, in 2017.

Biography

Early life and education 
Didion was born on December 5, 1934, in Sacramento, California, to Eduene (née Jerrett) and Frank Reese Didion. She had one brother five years her junior, James Jerrett Didion, who was a real estate executive. Didion recalled writing things down as early as the age of five, although she said that she never saw herself as a writer until after her work had been published. She identified as a "shy, bookish child" who pushed herself to overcome social anxiety through acting and public speaking, and who also was an avid reader. She spent her adolescence typing out Ernest Hemingway's works to learn more about how sentence structures worked.

Didion's early education was nontraditional. She attended kindergarten and first grade, but because her father was a finance officer in the Army Air Corps and the family constantly relocated, she did not attend school regularly. In 1943 or early 1944, her family returned to Sacramento, and her father went to Detroit to negotiate defense contracts for World War II. Didion wrote in her 2003 memoir Where I Was From that moving so often made her feel as if she were a perpetual outsider.

Didion received a bachelor of arts degree in English from the University of California, Berkeley, in 1956. During her senior year, she won first place in the "Prix de Paris" essay contest sponsored by Vogue, and was awarded a job as a research assistant at the magazine. The topic of her winning essay was the San Francisco architect William Wurster.

Vogue 
During her seven years at Vogue, from 1956 to 1964, Didion worked her way up from promotional copywriter to associate feature editor. Mademoiselle published Didion's article that was entitled "Berkeley’s Giant: The University of California" in January 1960. While at Vogue, and homesick for California, she wrote her first novel, Run, River (1963), about a Sacramento family as it comes apart. Writer and friend John Gregory Dunne helped her edit the book. Dunne was writing for Time magazine and was the younger brother of the author, businessman, and television mystery show host Dominick Dunne. She and Dunne married in 1964.

Didion and Dunne moved to Los Angeles in 1964, intending to stay only temporarily, but California remained their home for the following 20 years. In 1966, they adopted a daughter, whom they named Quintana Roo Dunne. The couple wrote many newsstand-magazine assignments. "She and Dunne started doing that work with an eye to covering the bills, and then a little more", Nathan Heller reported in The New Yorker. "Their [Saturday Evening] Post rates allowed them to rent a tumbledown Hollywood mansion, buy a banana-colored Corvette Stingray, raise a child, and dine well".

Didion lived in Los Feliz from 1963 to 1971; after living in Malibu for eight years, she and Dunne lived in Brentwood Park, a quiet, affluent, residential neighborhood of Los Angeles.

Slouching Towards Bethlehem 
In 1968, Didion published her first nonfiction book, Slouching Towards Bethlehem, a collection of magazine pieces about her experiences in California. Slouching Towards Bethlehem has been described as an example of New Journalism, using novel-like writing to cover the non-fiction realities of hippie counterculture. She wrote from her personal perspective; adding her own feelings and memories to situations, inventing details and quotes to make the stories more vivid, and using many metaphors in order for the reader to get a better understanding of the disorder present in the subjects of her essays, whether they be politicians, artists, or the American society. The New York Times characterized her writing as containing "grace, sophistication, nuance, [and] irony".

1970s 
Didion's novel Play It as It Lays, set in Hollywood, was published in 1970, and A Book of Common Prayer appeared in 1977. In 1979, she published The White Album, another collection of magazine pieces that previously appeared in Life, Esquire, The Saturday Evening Post, The New York Times, and The New York Review of Books. In the title essay of The White Album, Didion documents a episode she experienced in the summer of 1968. After undergoing psychiatric evaluation, she was diagnosed as having had an attack of vertigo and nausea. After periods of partial blindness in 1972, she was diagnosed with multiple sclerosis, but she remained in remission throughout her life. In her essay entitled "In Bed", Didion explains that she experienced chronic migraines.

Dunne and Didion worked closely together for most of their careers. Much of their writing is therefore intertwined. They co-wrote a number of screenplays, including a 1972 film adaptation of her novel Play It as It Lays that starred Anthony Perkins and Tuesday Weld and the screenplay for the 1976 film of A Star is Born. They also spent several years adapting the biography of journalist Jessica Savitch into the 1996 Robert Redford and Michelle Pfeiffer film, Up Close & Personal.

1980s and 1990s 
Didion's book-length essay entitled Salvador (1983) was written after a two-week trip to El Salvador with her husband. The next year, she published the novel Democracy, the story of a long, but unrequited love affair between a wealthy heiress and an older man, a CIA officer, against the background of the Cold War and the Vietnam War. Her 1987 nonfiction book entitled Miami looked at the different communities in that city. In 1988, Didion moved from California to New York City.

In a prescient New York Review of Books piece of 1991, a year after the various trials of the Central Park Five had ended, Didion dissected serious flaws in the prosecution's case, becoming the earliest mainstream writer to view the guilty verdicts as miscarriages of justice. She suggested the defendants were found guilty because of a sociopolitical narrative with racial overtones that clouded the judgment of the court.

In 1992, Didion published After Henry, a collection of twelve geographical essays and a personal memorial for Henry Robbins, who was Didion's friend and editor until his death in 1979. She published The Last Thing He Wanted, a romantic thriller, in 1996.

The Year of Magical Thinking 
In 2003, Didion's daughter Quintana Roo Dunne developed pneumonia that progressed to septic shock and she was comatose in an intensive-care unit when Didion's husband suddenly died of a heart attack on December 30. Didion delayed his funeral arrangements for approximately three months until Quintana was well enough to attend.

On October 4, 2004, Didion began writing The Year of Magical Thinking, a narrative of her response to the death of her husband and the severe illness of their daughter. She finished the manuscript 88 days later on New Year's Eve. Written at the age of 70, this was her first nonfiction book that was not a collection of magazine assignments. She said that she found the subsequent book-tour process very therapeutic during her period of mourning. Documenting the grief she experienced after the sudden death of her husband, the book was called a "masterpiece of two genres: memoir and investigative journalism" and won several awards.

Visiting Los Angeles after her father's funeral, Quintana fell at the airport, hit her head on the pavement and required brain surgery for hematoma. After progressing toward recovery in 2004, Quintana died of acute pancreatitis on August 26, 2005, aged 39, during Didion's New York promotion for The Year of Magical Thinking. Didion wrote about Quintana's death in the 2011 book Blue Nights.

2000s 

Didion was living in an apartment on East 71st Street in Manhattan in 2005. Everyman's Library published We Tell Ourselves Stories in Order to Live, a 2006 compendium of much of Didion's writing, including the full content of her first seven published nonfiction books (Slouching Towards Bethlehem, The White Album, Salvador, Miami, After Henry, Political Fictions, and Where I Was From), with an introduction by her contemporary, the critic John Leonard.

Didion began working with English playwright and director Sir David Hare on a one-woman stage adaptation of The Year of Magical Thinking in 2007. Produced by Scott Rudin, the Broadway play featured Vanessa Redgrave. Although Didion was hesitant to write for the theater, eventually she found the genre that was new to her, quite exciting.

Didion wrote early drafts of the screenplay for an untitled HBO biopic directed by Robert Benton on Katharine Graham,The Washington Post publisher. Sources say it may trace the paper's reporting on the Watergate scandal that led to the resignation of President Richard Nixon.

Later works 
Knopf published Blue Nights in 2011. It is a memoir about aging that also focused on Didion's relationship with her late daughter. More generally, the book deals with the anxieties Didion experienced about adopting and raising a child, as well as the aging process.

A photograph of Didion shot by Juergen Teller was used as part of the 2015 spring-summer campaign of the luxury French fashion brand Céline, while previously the clothing company Gap had featured her in a 1989 campaign. Didion's nephew Griffin Dunne directed a 2017 Netflix documentary about her, Joan Didion: The Center Will Not Hold.

Didion discusses her writing and personal life, including the deaths of her husband and daughter, adding context to her books The Year of Magical Thinking and Blue Nights.

In 2021, Didion published Let Me Tell You What I Mean, a collection of 12 essays she wrote between 1968 and 2000.

Personal life 
For several years in her twenties, Didion was in a relationship with Noel E. Parmentel Jr., a political pundit and figure on the New York literary and cultural scene.  According to Didion's husband, John Gregory Dunne, they met through Parmentel and were friends for six years before embarking on a romantic relationship. He stated that they had a celebration lunch after Dunne read the galleys for her first novel Run, River and while "[h]er other was out of town. It happened."  Didion and Dunne subsequently married, in January 1964, and remained husband and wife until his death from a heart attack suffered in 2003.  Breaking a long-held silence on Didion, whose work he championed and found publishers for, Parmentel was interviewed for a 1996 article in New York magazine. Parmentel had been angered in the 1970s by what he felt was a thinly veiled portrait of him in Didion's novel A Book of Common Prayer.

A Republican in her early years, Didion later drifted toward the Democratic Party, "without ever quite endorsing their core beliefs".

Death 
Didion died from complications of Parkinson's disease at home in Manhattan on December 23, 2021, at age 87.

Writing style and themes 
Didion viewed the structure of the sentence as essential to her work. In the New York Times article "Why I Write" (1976), Didion remarked, "To shift the structure of a sentence alters the meaning of that sentence, as definitely and inflexibly as the position of a camera alters the meaning of the object photographed... The arrangement of the words matters, and the arrangement you want can be found in the picture in your mind... The picture tells you how to arrange the words and the arrangement of the words tells you, or tells me, what's going on in the picture."

Didion was heavily influenced by Ernest Hemingway, whose writing taught her the importance of how sentences work in a text. Her other influences included George Eliot and Henry James, who wrote "perfect, indirect, complicated sentences".

Didion was also an observer of journalists, believing the difference between the process of fiction and nonfiction is the element of discovery that takes place in nonfiction, which happens not during the writing, but during the research.

Rituals were a part of Didion's creative process. At the end of the day, she would take a break from writing to remove herself from the "pages", saying that without the distance, she could not make proper edits. She would end her day by cutting out and editing prose, not reviewing the work until the following day. She would sleep in the same room as her work, saying: "That's one reason I go home to Sacramento to finish things. Somehow the book doesn't leave you when you're right next to it."

In a notorious 1980 essay, "Joan Didion: Only Disconnect," Barbara Grizzuti Harrison called Didion a "neurasthenic Cher" whose style was "a bag of tricks" and whose "subject is always herself".  In 2011, New York magazine reported that the Harrison criticism "still gets her (Didion's) hackles up, decades later".

Awards and honors 
 1981: Elected to the American Academy of Arts and Letters
 1996: Edward MacDowell Medal
 2002: The St. Louis Literary Award from the Saint Louis University Library Associates 
 2005: National Book Award for Nonfiction for The Year of Magical Thinking 
 2006: American Academy of Achievement's Golden Plate Award 
 2006: Elected to the American Philosophical Society 
 2007: Prix Medicis Essais for The Year of Magical Thinking 
 2007: National Book Foundation's Medal for Distinguished Contribution to American Letters 
 2007: Writers Guild of America Evelyn F. Burkey Award 
 2009: Honorary Doctor of Letters, Harvard University 
 2011: Honorary Doctor of Letters, Yale University 
 2013: National Humanities Medal, presented by President Barack Obama
 2013: Lifetime Achievement Award, PEN Center USA

Published works

Fiction 
 Run, River (1963)
 Play It as It Lays (1970)
 A Book of Common Prayer (1977)
 Democracy (1984)
 The Last Thing He Wanted (1996)

Nonfiction 
 Slouching Towards Bethlehem (1968)
 The White Album (1979)
 Salvador (1983)
 Miami (1987)
 After Henry (1992)
 Political Fictions (2001)
 Where I Was From (2003)
 Fixed Ideas: America Since 9.11 (2003; preface by Frank Rich)
 Vintage Didion (2004; selected excerpts of previous works)
 The Year of Magical Thinking (2005)
 We Tell Ourselves Stories in Order to Live: Collected Nonfiction (2006; includes her first seven volumes of nonfiction)
 Blue Nights (2011)  
 South and West: From a Notebook (2017)  
 Let Me Tell You What I Mean (2021)

Plays and screenplays 
 The Panic in Needle Park (1971) (with John Gregory Dunne and based on the novel by James Mills)
 Play It as It Lays (1972) (with John Gregory Dunne and based on her novel)
 A Star Is Born (1976) (with John Gregory Dunne)
 True Confessions (1981) (with John Gregory Dunne and based on his novel)
 Up Close & Personal (1996) (with John Gregory Dunne)
  As it Happens (2012) (with Todd Field)
 The Year of Magical Thinking (2007) (a stage play based on her book)

References

Further reading 
 Daugherty, Tracy. The Last Love Song: A Biography of Joan Didion. New York: St. Martin's Press, 2015.
 Davidson, Sara. Joan: Forty Years of Life, Loss, and Friendship with Joan Didion, 2012. .

External links 

 Official website
 Joan Didion on The California Museum's California Legacy Trails
 The New York Review of Books: Joan Didion
 
 

1934 births
2021 deaths
20th-century American essayists
20th-century American novelists
20th-century American women writers
21st-century American essayists
21st-century American memoirists
21st-century American women writers
American women essayists
American women journalists
American women memoirists
American women novelists
Deaths from Parkinson's disease
Members of the American Academy of Arts and Letters
Members of the American Philosophical Society
National Book Award winners
National Humanities Medal recipients
Neurological disease deaths in New York (state)
People from Brentwood, Los Angeles
People from Los Feliz, Los Angeles
People from the Upper East Side
Prix Médicis essai winners
University of California, Berkeley alumni
Writers from Los Angeles
Writers from Manhattan
Writers from Sacramento, California